The Asia/Oceania Zone is one of the three zones of regional Davis Cup competition in 2013.

In the Asia/Oceania Zone there are four different groups in which teams compete against each other to advance to the next group.

Participating nations

Seeds:

Remaining Nations:

Draw

 and  relegated to Group III in 2014.
 promoted to Group I in 2014.

First round

New Zealand vs. Lebanon

Sri Lanka vs. Pakistan

Kuwait vs. Thailand

Philippines vs. Syria

Second round

Pakistan vs. New Zealand

Philippines vs. Thailand

Play-off

Lebanon vs. Sri Lanka

Kuwait vs. Syria

Third round

New Zealand vs. Philippines

References

External links
Official Website

Asia Oceania Zone II
Davis Cup Asia/Oceania Zone